The Pandemic and All-Hazards Preparedness and Advancing Innovation Act (PAHPAI) is legislation introduced and passed by the U.S. Congress in 2019 that aims to improve the nation's preparation and response to public health threats, including both natural threats and deliberate man-made threats.

A previous bill (with a near-identical name), the Pandemic and All-Hazards Preparedness Act (PAHPA), was signed into law in 2006 and reauthorized in 2013 in order to create a system that prepares for, and responds to, public health threats that could turn into emergencies.

The 2019 bill (PAHPAI) was introduced by U.S. Senators Richard Burr (R-NC), Bob Casey (D-PA), Lamar Alexander (R-TN), and Patty Murray (D-WA). Congress passed the bill and sent it to President Trump for his signature in June 2019. (The bill number is S. 1379).

Background 
After the September 11, 2001 terrorist attacks and the anthrax attacks that followed, a critical need arose: to develop and stockpile medical countermeasures (certain drugs and vaccines) needed to protect people from chemical, biological, radiological, nuclear (CBRN) and pandemic threats.

However, medical countermeasures that address these types of threats, such as anthrax or the plague, have little or no commercial market. Therefore, the government needed to incentivize the private market to develop them. To do so, Congress passed the Project BioShield Act in 2004. That law created a federal program called the Special Reserve Fund (SRF) to incentivize development of these types of medical countermeasures.

Since 9/11, the United States has faced a number of additional sizable public health emergencies. The anthrax attacks of 2001, the destruction caused by Hurricane Katrina in 2005, and the Ebola outbreak in 2014 all raised alarm and concern about how the government should prepare for, and respond to, such events. Because of these events, Congress has attempted to vastly improve the federal government's ability to address these threats.

In 2006, passage of the Pandemic and All-Hazards Preparedness Act (PAHPA), among other things, created the Biomedical Advanced Research and Development Authority (BARDA) to provide companies with money and technical assistance in the advanced research and development of medical countermeasures.

Several key existing laws give authorities, budgets and policies and procedures to several government agencies tasked with responding to public health emergencies.

 The Public Health Service Act (PHS) created a streamlined federal response to public health emergencies by giving the United States Public Health Service the job of preventing the spread of infectious diseases from foreign countries into the United States.
 The Public Health Security and Bioterrorism Preparedness Act of 2002 gave funding to hospitals and health systems to augment the work of PHS.
 In 2004, the Project BioShield Act allowed the government to give incentives to the private sector to create drugs that could protect people from biological weapons and naturally-occurring biological threats.

When disasters such as wildfires, hurricanes, and disease outbreaks strike, many sectors (public health, healthcare, and the private sector) play a role in saving lives. According to the American Hospital Association, PAHPA is “the backbone of our nation’s health security” by giving the U.S. Department of Health and Human Services (HHS) the authority to respond to disasters.

After implementing the 2013 PAHPA reauthorization, Congress recognized certain federal programs, policies and procedures that needed improvement. The purpose of the 2019 PAHPAI bill is to implement these improvements.

Bioterrorism and antimicrobial resistance 
PAHPAI focuses on a variety of threats, but pays special attention to two specific threats: bioterrorism and “antimicrobial resistance.”

Bioterrorism occurs when a person or group of people intentionally release germs that can cause serious illness or death. Depending on the type of germ (also known as a “biological agent”), sometimes bioterrorism attacks can go almost completely undetected by technology because the biological agents are so microscopic in size.

Another emerging public health threat that is causing concern is the increase in “microbial resistance” among infectious diseases. Microbial resistance occurs when a person who has an infectious disease is given a countermeasure, such as an antibiotic medicine, and it does nothing to help the person get better.

Therefore, one of the goals of the PAHPAI law is to develop new therapies that are effective at treating infectious diseases.

Provisions of the legislation 

An “authorization” bill in Congress is legislation that creates, or continues, the existence of federal agencies and programs. Authorization bills also define the terms and conditions under which the agencies and programs operate, authorize Congress to appropriate funds to those programs, and spell out how the programs must use their funds. Therefore, a “reauthorization” bill is legislation that redefines these specifics for federal agencies and programs.

PAHPAI reauthorizes federal government programs that were established in the past by the Public Health Service Act and the Federal Food, Drug, and Cosmetic Act. The law makes significant changes and improvements to the agencies and programs under those two laws, in order to make the federal government more effective at preventing and responding to public health security threats such as bioterrorism attacks or disease outbreaks.

PAHPAI focuses on making changes in the law in order to improve the government's response to a number of public health threats, including:

 Biological attacks (such as anthrax)
 Multidrug-resistant pathogens
 Natural disasters (such as wildfires, hurricanes and flooding)
 Other deliberate attacks (such as nuclear weapons)
 Pandemics (such as outbreaks of infectious diseases such as Zika, Ebola, measles, and flu)

The legislation is divided among seven titles which are described below.

Title I - Strengthening the National Health Security Strategy 
Title I changes the National Health Security Strategy (NHSS) so that it includes a detailed description of all public health threats, as well as the processes to respond to each type of threat and emergency. It also adds zoonotic disease and disease outbreaks related to food and agriculture into the National Health Strategy.

The NHSS is a vision, set forth by HHS, to responding and managing public health emergencies. According to HHS:The 2019-2022 National Health Security Strategy (NHSS) provides a vision to strengthen our nation’s ability to prevent, detect, assess, prepare for, mitigate, respond to, and recover from disasters and emergencies. It describes strategies to improve readiness and adapt operational capabilities to address new and evolving threats. By coordinating a whole-of-government approach that engages external partners and supports public health authorities and health care stakeholders, we can better safeguard the health and well-being of people across the country.The NHSS is created every four years by HHS and the Office of the Assistant Secretary for Preparedness and Response (ASPR).

Title II - Improving Preparedness and Response 
Title II is further divided into 10 sections:

 Section 201: Improving Benchmarks and Standards for Preparedness and Response
 Requires the government to re-evaluate several important metrics of two programs: the Public Health Emergency Preparedness (PHEP) cooperative agreement and the Hospital Preparedness Program (HPP)
 Section 202: Amendments to Preparedness and Response Programs
 Reauthorizes the PHEP cooperative agreement and HPP through 2023
 Makes some changes to the two programs
 Section 203: Regional Health Care Emergency Preparedness and Response Systems
 Requires the federal government to give specific instructions to local hospitals and health systems to be able to respond to a bioterror attack, an emerging infectious disease outbreak, or a pandemic
 Was written with lessons learned from the Ebola virus outbreak in 2014 in mind
 Sets up a number of processes to improve coordination between the government and health responders
 Section 204: Military and Civilian Partnership for Trauma Readiness
 Brings together military trauma teams with civilian trauma centers (such as hospitals)
 Sets up a system for the two to cooperate in case of a national emergency
 Section 205: Public Health and Health Care Situational Awareness and Biosurveillance Capabilities
 Modernizes and adds more resources to the government's biosurveillance programs
 Expands coordination across government agencies to improve the “situational awareness” that is necessary to monitor, identify, and respond to CBRN threats
 Creates a budget for the government's biosurveillance network
 Reauthorizes biosurveillance and situational awareness programs through 2023
 Section 206: Strengthening and Supporting the Public Health Emergency Fund
 Clarifies specific incidents and how the Public Health Emergency Fund dollars can be spent
 Section 207: Improving All-Hazards Preparedness and Response by Public Health Emergency Volunteers
 Encourages states to let doctors and other health professionals to cross state lines to do their work during a public health emergency
 Helps states find ways to get more volunteers during public health emergencies
 Section 208: Clarifying State Liability Law for Volunteer Health Care Professionals
 Clarifies that in whichever state the disaster occurs, the liability laws for health care professionals from that state are applied
 Section 209: Report on Adequate National Blood Supply
 Requires a report with ways to get more blood donors and increase the national blood supply
 Section 210: Report on the Emergency Preparedness and Response Capabilities and Capacities of Hospitals, Long-term Care Facilities, and Other Health Care Facilities
 Requires a report that shows how prepared and ready to respond health care facilities are

Title III - Reaching All Communities 

Title III is further divided into six sections:

 Section 301: Strengthening and Assessing the Emergency Response Workforce
 Recent emergencies have put strain on the emergency response workforce and its capabilities, so this section closes the gaps needed to address these strains
 Reauthorizes the National Disaster Medical System and Medical Reserve Corps through 2023
 Section 302: Health System Infrastructure to Improve Preparedness and Response
 This section gives federal authorities more flexibility in getting emergency medical supplies and restocking the Strategic National Stockpile (SNS). (The SNS is a large supply of medicine and medical supplies to be used in public health emergencies. An example is the anthrax vaccine.)
 Section 303: Considerations for At-Risk Individuals
 Focuses federal efforts on making sure that at-risk individuals (such as pregnant and postpartum women and infants) are taken into consideration when doing emergency planning
 Section 304: Improving Emergency Preparedness and Response Considerations for Children
 Similar to Section 303, except focused on children
 Section 305: National Advisory Committees on Disasters
 Reauthorizes the National Advisory Committee on Children and Disasters through 2023
 Creates new advisory committees focused on senior citizens and people with disabilities
 Section 306: Guidance for Participation in Exercises and Drills
 Requires the government to finish writing a “guidance” on using public health emergency workers in drills and practice exercises

Title IV - Prioritizing a Threat-Based Approach 

Title IV is further divided into five sections:

 Section 401: Assistant Secretary for Preparedness and Response
 Encourages the HHS Assistant Secretary for Preparedness and Response (ASPR) to work with the intelligence agencies, Department of Defense, and public health agencies in carrying out his/her mission
 Section 402: Public Health Emergency Medical Countermeasure Enterprise (PHEMCE)
 Makes the existence of the PHEMCE permanent in federal law (The PHEMCE is a council of the heads of several agencies and is in charge of coordinating the federal government in gathering medical countermeasures to prepare for chemical, biological, radiological and nuclear threats (CBRN) and emerging infectious diseases)
 Section 403: Strategic National Stockpile
 Reauthorizes the SNS through 2023
 Focuses the efforts to replenish and supply the SNS based on a “threat-based approach”
 Section 404: Preparing for Pandemic Influenza, Antimicrobial Resistance, and Other Significant Threats
 Gives more authority to the head of the Biomedical Advanced Research and Development Authority (BARDA) to create initiatives to combat threats that are a significant risk to U.S. national security, in order to “accelerate and support advanced research, development, and procurement of countermeasures” to combat such threats
 (BARDA is a federal agency that helps companies inventing countermeasures such as vaccines and drugs move from the research phase all the way to FDA approval and inclusion of the vaccines and drugs into the SNS. It is focused on medical countermeasures that combat chemical, biological, radiological, and nuclear (CBRN) threats, as well as threats from pandemic influenza (PI) and emerging infectious diseases (EID). To-date, BARDA has supported 42 FDA approvals for products addressing CBRN, PI, and EID threats.)
 Section 405: Reporting on the Federal Select Agent Program
 Requires more reporting on the Select Agent Program (a federal program that “oversees the possession, use and transfer of biological select agents and toxins, which have the potential to pose a severe threat to public, animal or plant health or to animal or plant products”)

Title V - Increasing Communication in Medical Countermeasure Advanced Research and Development 
Title V is further divided into five sections:

 Section 501: Medical Countermeasure Budget Plan
 Expands the Countermeasure Budget Plan to coordinate more detail and communication regarding medical countermeasures
 Section 502: Material Threat and Medical Countermeasure Notifications
 Requires the government to better notify specific oversight committees in Congress “of current material threat determinations on an annual basis, and promptly notify Congress each time there is a change to such determinations.”
 Section 503: Availability of Regulatory Management Plans
 Requires the FDA to better help new medical countermeasure development companies apply to the government by posting the process online
 Section 504: BARDA and the Special Reserve Fund
 Reauthorizes both BARDA and BioShield Special Reserve Fund through 2023 (Project BioShield is the federal program to develop, acquire, stockpile, and distribute medical countermeasures to protect the U.S. against weapons of mass destruction)
 Section 505: Additional Strategies for Combating Antibiotic Resistance
 Officially writes into U.S. federal law the findings of the Presidential Advisory Council on Combating Antibiotic-Resistant Bacteria

Title VI - Advancing Technologies for Medical Countermeasures 

Title VI is further divided into seven sections:

 Section 601: Administration of Countermeasures
 Makes clear that BARDA can use existing resources to help get new technology related to medical countermeasures
 Section 602: Updating Definitions of Other Transactions
 Makes some technical changes to procedures
 Section 603: Medical Countermeasure Master Files
 Uses data to help companies developing new medical countermeasures submit their applications
 Requires the FDA to take certain steps to help Master File maintenance
 Section 604: Animal Rule Report
 Requires a report about the use of the “animal rule” in the development of medical countermeasures
 (In 2002, the FDA created a rule that allows the results of animal testing to be used for approval of products that will treat people in the event of a serious public health emergency, such as biological, chemical, radiological, or nuclear attacks)
 Section 605: Review of the Benefits of Genomic Engineering Technologies and Their Potential Role in National Security
 Creates a high-level meeting of people and organizations that help the federal government, along with private companies, to talk about potential ways that “genomic engineering technologies” could help improve national security
 Requires the ASPR to create a public report about the results of the meeting
 Section 606: Report on the Development of Vaccines to Prevent Future Epidemics
 Requires that a report be written about how the government worked with other countries in the past during public health emergencies; specifically how they did advanced R&D on products to help pandemics and epidemics
 Section 607: Strengthening Mosquito Abatement for Safety and Health (SMASH)
 Allows the government to continue using tools that help states and local governments control and watch mosquito populations, especially those that carry the Zika virus
 Continues a program that gives grants to epidemiology and laboratory efforts that are trying to control the spread of infectious diseases

Title VII - Miscellaneous Provisions 
Title VII is further divided into seven sections:

 Section 701: Reauthorizations and Extensions
 Extends a number of federal programs and laws, such as funding for VA hospitals, flu vaccine tracking, and the distribution of flu vaccines during a pandemic
 Section 702: Location of Materials in the Stockpile
 Limits what the government can disclose to the public about the Strategic National Stockpile, in cases where doing so could affect U.S. national security
 Section 703: Cybersecurity
 Requires the government to create a strategy to protect the public's health in case of a cyber attack that threatens U.S. national security
 Section 704: Report
 Requires that the government publish a report about what the ASPR has done to help migrant children and their families reunite, as the result of federal immigration policies
 Section 705: Technical Changes
 Makes some technical changes to various laws

Legislative history

Original law 

In 2006, during the 109th Congress (2005-2006), Senator Richard Burr introduced S. 3678, the Pandemic and All-Hazards Preparedness Act. It passed Congress and was signed into law by President George W. Bush (Public Law 109-417).

Senators Richard Burr and the late Edward Kennedy (D-MA) spearheaded the original legislation.

First reauthorization 
In 2013, the original Pandemic and All-Hazards Preparedness Act of 2006 needed to be reauthorized. Senator Richard Burr introduced S. 242, the Pandemic and All-Hazards Preparedness Reauthorization Act. The bill, however, never made it to a full vote in the Senate. In the House, Rep. Mike Rogers introduced the same legislation, H.R. 307. That bill passed Congress and was signed into law by President Barack Obama (Public Law 113-5).

Second reauthorization 
In 2018, during the 115th Congress (2017-2018) the law once again needed to be updated and reauthorized. Senator Burr introduced S. 2852, the Pandemic and All-Hazards Preparedness and Advancing Innovation Act of 2018. The bill made it through committee consideration but never reached a full vote in the Senate. In the House, Rep. Susan Brooks introduced companion legislation, H.R. 6378. Brooks’ bill passed the House, but was never considered in the Senate. Once the 115th Congress ended, both bills were effectively dead.

The following year, in 2019 during the first year of the 116th Congress (2019-2020), Senator Burr re-introduced the All-Hazards Preparedness and Advancing Innovation Act as S. 1379. The bill was passed by Congress and on June 24, 2019 it was signed by President Trump on June 24, 2019 (PL 116-22).

Table summary of legislative versions

S. 1379 procedural history 
The Pandemic and All-Hazards Preparedness and Advancing Innovation Act of 2019 (S. 1379) was introduced in the Senate by Richard Burr on May 8, 2019. On May 15, the Senate Committee on Health, Education, Labor, and Pensions passed the bill by unanimous consent. That same day, the full Senate passed the bill by voice vote.

On June 4, the House passed the bill by voice vote. The legislation was sent to President Trump on June 13, who signed it into law on June 24, 2019 as Public Law 116-22.

See also 

 Assistant Secretary for Preparedness and Response (ASPR)
 Bioterrorism
 BioWatch
 Blue Ribbon Study Panel on Biodefense
 Centers for Disease Control and Prevention
 Government Accountability Office (GAO)
 Medical Reserve Corps
National Biosurveillance Strategy
National Disaster Medical System
National Intelligence Assessments on Infectious Diseases
National Response Framework
Select agent
Strategic National Stockpile

References

External links
Antibiotic / Antimicrobial Resistance (AR / AMR) - CDC
 Blue Ribbon Study Panel on Biodefense
 Federal Select Agent Program
 Hospital Preparedness Program (HPP)
 National Biodefense Strategy summary
 National Biodefense Strategy (full text)
National Health Security Strategy 2019-2022 (full text)
National Strategy for Chemical, Biological, Radiological, Nuclear, and Explosives (CBRNE) Standards
Public Health and Social Services Emergency Fund
Public Health Emergency Preparedness (PHEP) Cooperative Agreement
Statement from the President on the National Biodefense Strategy and National Security Presidential Memorandum (9/18/18)

United States Department of Health and Human Services
United States federal health legislation
United States federal emergency management legislation
Acts of the 116th United States Congress